Mikhaela Donnelly (born 30 April 1994) is an Australian professional basketball player.

Career

WNBL
Donnelly began her career playing for the Australian Institute of Sport. After a two-year stint, she then signed in her home state, with the Logan Thunder. She would spend two seasons with the Thunder, until the team folded due to financial difficulties.

After a three-year absence from the league, Donnelly returned for the 2017–18 season with the Townsville Fire.

National Team

Youth Level
Donnelly made her international debut for the national team at the 2009 FIBA Oceania Under-16 Championship in Brisbane, Queensland. Donnelly was not selected to the final side for the Under-17 World Championship in France the following year.

In 2010, Donnelly represented Australia at the inaugural Youth Olympic Games in Singapore.

Personal life
In March 2017, Donnelly gave birth to her first child, Adisyn.

References

1994 births
Living people
Australian Institute of Sport basketball (WNBL) players
Australian women's basketball players
Basketball players at the 2010 Summer Youth Olympics
Guards (basketball)
Logan Thunder players
Sportswomen from Queensland
Townsville Fire players
People educated at John Paul College (Brisbane)